Tetsa River is a river in northeastern British Columbia, Canada. It heads in the Northern Rocky Mountains Provincial Park, and flows northeast and then east into the Muskwa River. In the area around Tetsa River grows mainly pine forests. The area around Tetsa River is almost uninhabited, with less than two inhabitants per square kilometre. Highway 97 / Alaska Highway runs through this place.

The neighbourhood is part of the boreal climate zones. Annual average temperature is -0.8 °C. The warmest month is July, with an average temperature of 13.5 °C, and the coldest is January, -15.9 °C.

Climate

References

Rivers of British Columbia